A List of churches in Aberdeenshire, Scotland:

Arbuthnott, Bervie & Kinneff Parish Church
Blairs College
Chapel of St. Mary and St. Nathalan
Christ Church, Kincardine O'Neil
Cookney Church
Crathie Kirk
Crimond Church
Dunnottar Parish Church
Fraserburgh Old Parish Church
St Mary's Chapel, Rattray
St Mary's Kirk, Auchindoir
St Ninian's Chapel, Braemar
St Peter's Church, Aberdeen
Saint Ternan's Church
Skene Parish Church
Udny Parish Church

External links

 Churches in Aberdeenshire
Aberdeenshire